Eighteen Year Olds is a 1955 Italian comedy film directed by Mario Mattoli and starring Marisa Allasio.

Cast
 Marisa Allasio as Anna Campolmi
 Virna Lisi as Maria Rovani
 Anthony Steffen as the physics teacher (as Antonio De Teffè)
 Margherita Bagni as the headmistress
 Ave Ninchi as miss Mattei
 Adriana Benetti as the music teacher
 Luisella Boni as Luisa 
 Pietro De Vico as Campanelli
 Enzo Garinei as Stalliere
 Ivo Garrani as Il medico
 Rina Morelli as madre di Maria
 Ave Ninchi as Signorina Mattei
 Luigi Pavese as professore di greco
 Nora Ricci as assistante del collegio
 Virgilio Riento as il portiere del collegio

References

External links

1955 films
1955 comedy films
Italian comedy films
1950s Italian-language films
Films directed by Mario Mattoli
Films set in Rome
1950s Italian films